The International Adkins Chiti: Women in Music Foundation was founded in 1996. It grew from 'Donne in Musica', founded by Patricia Adkins Chiti in 1978, and is a member organisation of the UNESCO International Music Council (see European Music Council).

The two bodies were founded to promote women’s musical creativity through a network which has grown to 41,000 female composers and musicians from 109 countries (as at 2015). The Foundation’s library and archive keeps over 43,000 scores by female composers from different periods, encyclopaedias, books and databases, and a digital ‘Encyclopaedia of Living European Women Composers, Songwriters and Creators of Music’.

The foundation has sponsored the European Union WIMUST (Women in Music Uniting Strategies for Talent) programme, promoting solutions to fight gender based discrimination and inequalities for women in music.

In September 2013, Fondazione Adkins Chiti: Donne in Musica presented on the topic of redressing gender based discrimination and inequalities for women in music through the EU WIMUST (Women in Music Uniting Strategies for Talent) programme at an event in London. This was organised by MEPs Mary Honeyball and MEP Silvia Costa (“Rapporteur” to the European Parliament for Creative Europe) and the RT Hon. Harriet Harman, UK shadow Minister for Culture and Equality. The event featured Errollyn Wallen, radio producer Debbie Golt and jazz musician Issie Barrett.

References

Women in classical music